Ermengarde or Ermengard or Ermingarde or Irmingard or Irmgard is a feminine given name of Germanic origin derived from the Germanic words "ermen/irmin," meaning "whole, universal" and "gard" meaning "enclosure, protection". Armgarð is a Faroese version. It is the name of various historical women:

Ermengarde of Hesbaye (778–818), wife of Louis the Pious
Irmgard of Chiemsee (died 866), also known as Ermengard, daughter of Louis the German, remembered in the calendar as a saint
Ermengarde of Anjou (disambiguation), multiple people
Ermengarde of Tonnerre (1032–1083), wife of William I, Count of Nevers
Ermengarde of Narbonne, Viscountess of Narbonne
Ermengarde de Beaumont (1170–1234), wife of William I of Scotland
Ermengard of Provence, wife of Boso of Provence
Ermengard of Tours, wife of Lothair I
Ermengarde of Auvergne, mother of William I of Aquitaine
Ermengarde of Burgundy, wife of Gilbert, Duke of Burgundy
Ermengarde of Tuscany (901–931/932), wife of Adalbert I of Ivrea
Ermengarde of Maine (died 1126), wife of Fulk V of Anjou
Ermengarde of Zutphen (died 1138), mother of Henry I, first count of Guelders and Zutphen
Princess Irmingard of Bavaria (1923–2010)

German feminine given names
Feminine given names